, also known as Doraemon and the Spiral City, is a feature-length Doraemon film which premiered in Japan on 8 March 1997, based on the 17th volume of the same name of the Doraemon Long Stories series. It was the last Doraemon film to be supervised by Hiroshi Fujimoto, due to his death. It's the 18th Doraemon film. In India, it was released on July 26, 2020.

Plot
Suneo is boasting about his private ground to Nobita, Gian, and Shizuka. Fed up, Nobita says that he will show his own ranch to them. When Doraemon refuses to help him, Nobita tries to find a way and discovers that Doraemon has won several lotteries that award "planets", though all of them are nothing more than inhabitable asteroids. When his friends come, Nobita shows a random planet to them, but to his surprise they arrive at a habitable and lush planet. Using a clockwork screw, they bring life to several toys and go on to build a toy town. Doraemon also builds an Egg Factory which gives birth living toys through toy eggs and a Photocopy Mirror. While capturing several satellite photos, they notice a shining substance inside a crater. Nobita and his friends go to explore the crater, but are hindered by a storm that wash them up to the shore. Returning to the city, they discover that the lightning-struck Egg Factory have produced toys that have human-like intelligence. Meanwhile, an escaped convict, Onigoro Kumatora, lets slip to Nobita's house and enters the toy city. When Nobita and his friends are distracted, Onigoro steals their city map, copies himself in the Egg Factory and with his copies travels to the crater.

Nobita and his friends continue to run the toy city and are surprised by another storm which give life to more intelligent toys. As they are still curious about the planet, they plan to use an enlarged Suneo's toy rocket to explore the planet from space. Meanwhile, Onigoro and his copies arrive at the crater, but find that it is not gold as they presumed, but instead a giant shape-shifting monster that attacks them. They escape and sabotage Suneo's rocket, cornering the group near a chasm. When they try to cross it, Shizuka's skirt gets snagged on the ladder. When Nobita risks his life to save her, his hand slips and he falls inside the chasm and lands on a bush, rendered unconscious. As the monster rampages again, the rest of the group and Onigoro escape using Suneo's rocket, but realize that it cannot fly for so long as it is only a toy, thus Onigoro and his copies stray away from the rocket while holding the others hostage, though they manage to escape before the explosion. Meanwhile, Nobita awakes and meets with the "Seed Sower", an ancient shape-shifter being who is the true identity of the monster. He explains that he had tried multiple times to give life on planets, including Earth and Mars, eventually settling the toy planet as his choice. While at first he tries to stop humans from entering the planet (Nobita and his friends are revealed to had entered the planet accidentally), he eventually chooses to give the responsibility of it in the humans' hands, before going away. With the help of the plants, Nobita escapes from the chasm and regroups with the others.

Learning that Onigoro has taken control of the toy city, Nobita and his friends plan an attack to reclaim the city. They manage to drive Onigoro and his copies off the city, but they plan to attack them the next day. However, Nobita and his friends enlist the help of the toys, and with them they capture Onigoro and his copies and collapses them back to one being, who turns out to be a mole-faced Onigoro (the least hostile of them), planning to surrender to the police kindly. Nobita and his friends then give the responsibility of the planet to the living toys before heading back to Earth.

Cast

Release
The film was released in Japan on 8 March 1997. It premiered in India on the Disney Channel on 25 July 2020, at 10.30 AM. It was telecast on Hungama TV on 26 July 2020, at 10 AM.

References

External links

Films directed by Tsutomu Shibayama
Nobita's Adventure in Clockwork City
Films set in Slovenia
1997 films
1997 anime films
Animated films about extraterrestrial life
Films scored by Shunsuke Kikuchi